Pavol Pronaj  (born 30 May 1982, in Martin) is a Slovak professional footballer, who plays as a goalkeaper for MŠK Fomat Martin in the Slovak Third League.

External links
 
 
 Player profile Znicz Pruszków 

1982 births
Living people
Slovak footballers
Czech First League players
SK Dynamo České Budějovice players
Odra Opole players
Motor Lublin players
Znicz Pruszków players
Expatriate footballers in Poland
Slovak expatriate sportspeople in Poland
Association football goalkeepers
Sportspeople from Martin, Slovakia
Slovak expatriate footballers
Slovak expatriate sportspeople in the Czech Republic
Expatriate footballers in the Czech Republic